Vukov is a Serbo-Croatian surname, related to the male given name Vuk, meaning wolf.

Notable people with this surname include:

 Borivoj Vukov (1929–2010), Serbian wrestler
 Stefano Vukov (born 1987), Croatian tennis coach
 Tina Vukov (born 1988), Croatian singer
 Vice Vukov (1936–2008), Croatian singer and politician

See also
 Vukov Spomenik, Belgrade, Serbia
 Vukov sabor, Serbian cultural event